Robert Hurst (born October 4, 1964) is an American jazz bassist.

Biography
Hurst played guitar early in his career before concentrating on bass. He worked with Out of the Blue in 1985 and also did work with musicians such as Tony Williams, Mulgrew Miller, Harry Connick Jr., Geri Allen, Russell Malone, and Steve Coleman. From 1986 to 1991 Hurst played in Wynton Marsalis's ensemble, and played with Branford Marsalis in the early 1990s. He was also a member of The Tonight Show Band. His debut as a leader, 1993's Robert Hurst Presents, reached No. 13 on the Billboard Top Jazz Albums chart. He currently teaches jazz bass at the University of Michigan.

Discography

As leader
 Robert Hurst Presents: Robert Hurst (Columbia, 1992)
 One for Namesake (Sony, 1993)
 Unrehurst, Vol. 1 (Bebob, 2002)
 Unrehurst, Vol. 2 (Bebob, 2010)
 Bob Ya Head (Bebob, 2010)
 Bob: A Palindrome (Bebob, 2013)
 Black Current Jam (Dot Time, 2017)

As sideman
With Chris Botti
 2005 To Love Again: The Duets
 2009 Chris Botti in Boston
 2012 Impressions

With Donald Brown
 1988 Early Bird
 1991 People Music (Muse)

With Diana Krall
 2004 Live at the Montreal Jazz Festival
 2005 Christmas Songs
 2006 From This Moment On
 2008 Christmas Hits & Duos
 2009 Quiet Nights
 2010 Doing All Right: In Concert

With Ellis Marsalis Jr.
 1990 Ellis Marsalis Trio
 1993 Whistle Stop

With  Branford Marsalis
 1987 Renaissance
 1990 Crazy People Music
 1990 Music from Mo' Better Blues
 1991 Bloomington
 1991 The Beautyful Ones Are Not Yet Born
 1992 I Heard You Twice the First Time
 2004 The Steep Anthology

With Wynton Marsalis
 1986 J Mood
 1987 Live at Blues Alley (Wynton Marsalis album)
 1987 Marsalis Standard Time, Vol. I
 1988 Thick in the South: Soul Gestures in Southern Blue, Vol. 1
 1990 Standard Time, Vol. 2: Intimacy Calling
 2004 Trios
 2007 Standards & Ballads

With Greg Osby
 2003 St. Louis Shoes
 2004 Public

With Out of the Blue
 1985 Out of the Blue
 1986 Inside Track

With others
 1986 Bemsha Swing, Woody Shaw
 1988 20, Harry Connick Jr.
 1988 Cipher Syntax, Strata Institute
 1989 Bluestruck, Terumasa Hino
 1989 Face to Face, Renee Rosnes
 1989 Hard Groovin', Ricky Ford
 1989 Scene One, Vincent Herring
 1989 The Road Less Traveled, Marvin Smitty Smith
 1990 From Day to Day, Mulgrew Miller
 1991 Kenny Kirkland, Kenny Kirkland
 1991 The Nurturer, Geri Allen
 1992 Guitar on Top, Dave Stryker
 1992 Russell Malone, Russell Malone
 1993 In Focus, Bruce Barth
 1994 Live at Bradley's, Kevin Eubanks
 1995 Vanessa Rubin Sings, Vanessa Rubin
 1995 West Coast Jazz Summit, Eric Reed
 1996 King Shaman, Medwyn Goodall
 1997 That Day..., Dianne Reeves
 1998 In the Long Run, Dave Ellis
 1998 Seasons 4 U, Lou Rawls
 2000 Treasure Chest, Joe Gilman
 2001 Big Wide Grin, Keb' Mo'
 2001 Surfacing, John Beasley
 2001 The Power of the String, Paul Jackson
 2001 Vertigo, René Marie
 2002 A Love Affair in Paris, Buddy Montgomery
 2002 Blue Black, Jean Toussaint
 2002 Jazz Is a Spirit, Terri Lyne Carrington
 2002 New Light, Bill Mobley
 2002 Pasa Tiempo, Joe Louis Walker
 2003 Mapenzi, Ronald Muldrow
 2003 Summertime, Mike Clark
 2004 The Art of Five, Billy Cobham
 2005 It's Time, Michael Bublé
 2005 Jumping the Creek, Charles Lloyd
 2005 SF Jazz Collective, SFJAZZ Collective
 2005 Sings the Peggy Lee Songbook, Bette Midler
 2006 Beyond the Wall, Kenny Garrett
 2006 Kinesthetics, Scott Kinsey
 2007 Collaborations, Jill Scott
 2007 Mosaic Select: Tony Williams, Tony Williams
 2008 Yo-Yo Ma & Friends: Songs of Joy & Peace, Yo-Yo Ma
 2009 American Classic, Willie Nelson
 2009 Love Is the Answer, Barbra Streisand
 2010 ... Featuring Norah Jones, Norah Jones
 2012 Kisses on the Bottom, Paul McCartney

Film and video
 Steven Soderburgh – Ocean's Thirteen, 2007
 Steven Soderburgh – The Good German, 2006
 George Clooney – Good Night and Good Luck, 2005
 Steven Soderburgh – Ocean's Twelve, 2004
 Steven Soderburgh – Ocean's Eleven, 2000
 MTV Films on VH–1 – Tamara Davis, Single Ladies, 2011
 PBS Great Performances – Happy Birthday Ella: A Tribute to the First Lady of Song, 2007
 HBO Green House Productions – Mackie Austin Hard Road Home, 2007
 Sony Music Entertainment – Chris Botti in Boston, 2009
 The Verve Music Group – Live at the Montreal Jazz Festival with Diana Krall, Verve, 2005
 ABC – Their Eyes Were Watching God, 2005
 Horn of the Moon Productions – Paco Farias Short Film, Broken, 2003
 Brown Sugar – 2002
 Men of Honor – 2000
 Dinner with Friends – HBO Films. RL. Hurst musician, original score by Dave Grusin
 The Blue Lobster – Dogma 2000 Presentation
 The Wood – Paramount Pictures presents an MTV Films Production
 Beverly Hillbillies, Been There Done That, Theme & Soundtrack
 Spike Lee Clockers, Mo' Better Blues, Do the Right Thing – Soundtrack
 USC–Independent Productions – The Expendables, Featuring: Brother Try 'n Catch a Cab on the East Side Blues & Simi Valley Blues by Robert Hurst
 20th Century Fox Film Co., Keenan Wayans – In Living Color Featuring: Detroit Red by Robert Hurst (A dance bumper for the Fly Girls)
 Acorn Productions, Bernie Casey – The Dinner
 CBS Music Video Enterprises: Wynton Marsalis–Blues & Swing
 Columbia Records & Pennebaker Associates, Inc., Branford Marsalis–The Music Tells You: Title track, Roust About Composed by Robert Hurst (Jazz Hall of Fame Inductee)
 Sony Music International Branford Marsalis – BB's Blues
 Chanticleer Films – Marco Williams – Without a Pass Featuring compositions by Robert Hurst (Cable Ace Award Nominee)

References

 

American jazz double-bassists
Male double-bassists
1964 births
Living people
Columbia Records artists
Musicians from Detroit
DIW Records artists
University of Michigan faculty
Jazz musicians from Michigan
21st-century double-bassists
21st-century American male musicians
American male jazz musicians
Branford Marsalis Quartet members
Out of the Blue (American band) members
SFJAZZ Collective members
Superblue (band) members